The 2018 GT Series Sprint Cup (Known for sponsorship reasons as the 2018 Blancpain Series Sprint Cup)was the sixth season of the GT Series Sprint Cup following on from the demise of the SRO Motorsports Group's FIA GT1 World Championship (an auto racing series for grand tourer cars), the fifth with the seasons sponsored by Blancpain. The season began on 7 April at Zolder and ended on 16 September at the Nürburgring.

Calendar
At the annual press conference during the 2017 24 Hours of Spa on 28 July, the Stéphane Ratel Organisation announced the first draft of the 2018 calendar. Zolder became the season opener instead of Misano. On 9 October 2017, the finalised calendar was announced, confirming the dates of the races at the Hungaroring.

Race format
In previous years a race weekend consisted of one Qualifying session, one Qualifying Race - of which the results set up the grid for the Main Race - and one Main Race. On 2 October 2017, changes to the format of race weekends were announced. In 2018 a race weekend consisted of two races scoring equal points and featuring separate Qualifying sessions for each race.

Entry list

Race results
Bold indicates overall winner.

Championship standings
Scoring system
Championship points were awarded for the first ten positions in each race. The pole-sitter also received one point and entries were required to complete 75% of the winning car's race distance in order to be classified and earn points. Individual drivers were required to participate for a minimum of 25 minutes in order to earn championship points in any race. A new points system was introduced this season. It takes the maximum points an entry could earn in the old 'Qualifying Race + Main Race'-format divided by two.

Drivers' championships

Overall

Silver Cup

Pro-Am Cup

Am Cup

Teams' championships

Overall

Pro-Am Cup

Am Cup

See also
2018 GT Series
2018 GT Series Endurance Cup
2018 GT Series Asia

Notes

References

External links

Sprint Cup
2018 in motorsport